Colour Scheme is a detective novel by Ngaio Marsh; it is the twelfth novel to feature Roderick Alleyn, and was first published in 1943.  The novel takes place in New Zealand during World War II; the plot involves suspected espionage activity at a hot springs resort on the coast of New Zealand's Northland region and a gruesome murder whose solution exposes the spy. Alleyn himself is working for military intelligence in their counterespionage division. Marsh's next novel Died in the Wool also concerns Alleyn's counterespionage work in New Zealand.

Background 
According to her biographers Margaret Lewis  and Joanne Drayton, for most of her adult life, Ngaio Marsh divided her time between her native New Zealand and travel abroad, with frequent and often prolonged periods spent in England, where most of her detective fiction is set. World War Two interrupted this pattern, obliging Ngaio Marsh to remain in New Zealand from April 1938 until June 1949, when she finally returned to England for another lengthy stay. During this ten-year period, Marsh lived with her elderly father on the outskirts of Christchurch, continued to write, drove a Red Cross transport vehicle and began her dedicated project to develop a professional theatre in New Zealand, working with students from Canterbury University, directing, producing and touring plays around the country. Again, according to her biographers, this had an inevitable and interesting effect on her detective fiction.

Marsh was commissioned by her publishers Collins to write one of their series of illustrated books for schools, The British Commonwealth In Pictures, and she travelled the country extensively while writing her contribution, New Zealand, published in 1942. Since her 1938 return to New Zealand, four Roderick Alleyn mysteries had been written and published (Overture To Death, Death At The Bar, Surfeit Of Lampreys and Death And The Dancing Footman), all set in England. Now in 1942, Marsh decided to set her next two novels (Colour Scheme and Died In The Wool) in New Zealand, dispatching her series detective Roderick Alleyn there, to investigate wartime espionage. Although Marsh published two further New Zealand-set Alleyn mysteries (Vintage Murder 1937, Photo Finish 1980), the two wartime New Zealand novels stand distinctly apart from her main body of detective fiction.

Plot summary 
In New Zealand's North Island, near the fictional coastal town of Harpoon, the Claire family operates the Wai-ata-tapu hot springs.  Colonel Claire struggles to turn a profit and businessman Maurice Questing is eager to call up his loan and seize the resort.  Meanwhile, Colonel Claire's brother-in-law, Dr. James Ackrington, writes to Inspector Roderick Alleyn alerting him that Questing may be an enemy agent. Questing was observed flashing Morse Code from Rangi Peak and soon after an allied ship was sunk.  In addition, the local Maori leaders suspect Questing is a treasure hunter seeking to loot sacred Maori weapons.

Questing invites Shakespearean actor Geoffrey Gaunt to stay at Wai-ata-tapu to heal his ailing leg.  Gaunt and his secretary Dikon Bell fall in love with the Claires' daughter, Barbara.  Gaunt secretly purchases a fancy dress for Barbara from a fashionable shop in Auckland which Questing pretends is from him.  Tension escalates when alcoholic handyman, Bert Smith, accuses Questing of trying to murder him by claiming the rail signal was green when it was red.  Questing denies this and claims the signal was broken.  A mysterious newcomer arrives at the springs named Septimus Falls.  The Claires' son Simon suspects Falls is an enemy ally of Questing's because he tapped the same Morse Code signals with his pipe.  

Everyone comes together at a concert put on by the Te Rarawa community in their village hall, in honour of Geoffrey Gaunt, at which several outbursts and confrontations occur, before the guests set out variously to return to the Hostel through the area of boiling mud pools and hot springs. Questing does not return and a horrific scream issuing from the thermal area suggests that that he has fallen into Taupo-tapu, the huge boiling mud pool, where according to Maori legend a dishonoured Te Rarawa girl once met this fate with a similar, terrible shriek. This proves to be the case when Questing's skull is spit up out of the mud.  Falls and Bell lead the group at Wai-ata-tapu in the investigation.  Ackrington insists Questing must have faked his death and escaped New Zealand because the Claires were on to him.  Falls insists he was murdered.

The police discover a historic Maori battle adze that belonged to the local chief's grandfather.  The adze's location was considered secret known only to a few select people. Huia, the Claires' housekeeper, admits she overheard her grandfather talking about the adze and told Questing its location.  Questing hired Smith to find the adze so he could sell it to Gaunt.  However, Smith betrayed Questing and lured him into the mud pool.  Falls determines only Smith could have killed Questing because only Smith knew Questing was colorblind. Questing confessed this to Smith in order to explain the mishap with the traffic signal.  Because the white flags indicating a safe path along the mud pools had been moved, Questing went down the wrong path because he could not see the red flags indicating danger.

Septimus Falls reveals himself to be Roderick Alleyn undercover during World War II.  He says Questing was not an enemy agent but Bert Smith was.

Characters 
Chief-Inspector Roderick Alleyn of Scotland Yard
Colonel Edward and Agnes Claire - owners of Wai-ata-tapu
Simon Claire - their son
Barbara Claire - their daughter
Dr James Ackrington - Agnes Claire's brother
Geoffrey Gaunt - a celebrated actor
Dikon Bell - his secretary
Maurice Questing - a businessman
Bert Smith - an alcoholic handyman
Rua - Maori chief
Alfred Colly - Gaunt's dresser
Septimus Falls - a guest at Wai-ata-tapu
Huia - Maori housekeeper at Wai-ata-tapu
Detective Sergeant Webley

Television adaptation 
Colour Scheme was one of four Alleyn novels adapted for New Zealand television in 1977; Alleyn was played by George Baker in a series called the Ngaio Marsh Theatre.

References 

Roderick Alleyn novels
1943 British novels
Novels set in New Zealand
Novels set during World War II
Collins Crime Club books